ECR Music Group is an American independent music company based in Manhattan. It was founded by recording artist and producer Blake Morgan in 2002 as record label Engine Company Records. Re-branded as ECR Music Group in late 2012, it now includes a roster of both labels and artists. The label differs from its counterparts in its artist-friendly philosophy and partnership wherein all ECR artists and labels own 100% of their master recordings.

Artists on ECR Music Group have included Janita, James McCartney, Bari Leigh, Terry Manning, Blake Morgan, Lesley Gore, David Cloyd, Melissa Giges, indie band Shimmerplanet, Mike Errico, and many others. Morgan produces the releases, and genres vary significantly. Despite releasing only a few albums a year, in 2005 the label landed five albums in the Top 20 simultaneously, including Lesley Gore's Ever Since and Rick Henrickson's Reaching For A Gun. The label continues to be active, and recently released Didn't You, My Dear?   by Brooklyn-based singer-songwriter Janita, Just When I Let Go by Melissa Giges  and Diamonds In The Dark by Blake Morgan.

ECR Music Group is distributed by The Orchard. As of 2015, labels include Cabin Music, Dylanna Music, Engine Company Records, Hook & Ladder Records, Lucky Seven Records, and Starfish Music.

History 

ECR Music Group was founded as Engine Company Records in 2002 by singer-songwriter, producer, and activist Blake Morgan. In 1996 Morgan had signed a seven-record deal with Phil Ramone's N2K Sony/Red label. However, he quickly became frustrated being on a corporate label. After his first tour he found a loophole in the contract. Despite being the label's most successful artist at the time, he told Ramone he wanted out of the deal. Morgan then began going to bands and artists he was recording at the time, and pitched an independent label where they would have control over their own material and output. He officially launched Engine Company Records in Manhattan, New York City in 2002, and remains CEO and owner.

ECR Music Group announced the official launch date of its rebranding as October 4, 2012. The company now consists of an interconnected set of businesses and distinct resources, each aimed at helping its artists realize long-term creative and commercial success. Uniquely, ECR Music Group achieves these goals while operating under an elemental principle, unprecedented in the music world: All of its artists and labels own 100% of their master recordings.

Similar to Rick Rubin's relationship with American Recordings, Morgan produces most of the music for the label. Genres have ranged from emo/punk, to alternative rock, to country, to classical. Recordings have taken place in locations such as The Hit Factory in New York and Compass Point Studios in the Bahamas. Among artists and producers that have worked with the label are James McCartney, Lesley Gore, Janita, David Cloyd, Mike Errico, Patti Rothberg, David Kahne, and Phil "Butcher Bros." Nicolo, and Terry Manning. In a Sonicscoop interview Morgan singles out Terry Manning and Phil Nicolo as mentors. Morgan says: “One of the great things I’ve had in my career, that a lot of people have less and less of, is incredible mentors, who are giants in the recording world. Terry Manning and Phil Nicolo, these two guys have been incredible Obi-Wan Kenobis' for me."

Born from humble beginnings in a one-room makeshift recording studio and office, and launched on Morgan’s laptop computer, ECR Music Group has flourished and grown over the years to become a globally distributed family of artists and labels. As of 2015, its sub-labels include Cabin Music, Dylanna Music, Engine Company Records, Hook & Ladder Records, Lucky Seven Records, and Starfish Music.

Notable releases

In the first year of its existence, the label released four albums by artists such as indie band Shimmerplanet and professional musician Mike Errico. In summer of 2005 the label landed five albums in the Top 20 simultaneously, including Lesley Gore's Ever Since and Rick Henrickson's Reaching For A Gun. Gore's first album of new material since the 1970s, Ever Since was recorded with Morgan. The album received extensive national radio coverage and acclaim from The New York Times, Rolling Stone, and Billboard Magazine. Several songs from Ever Since have been used in television shows and films, and the track "Words We Don't Say" was featured in an episode of The L Word.

Morgan's solo album Burning Daylight was released on the label on July 12, 2005. Co-produced with Grammy Award-winner Phil "Butcher Bros." Nicolo, it reached #1 on eMusic's album charts. The bonus track of his cover of Paul McCartney's "Maybe I'm Amazed" became the most successful track in the history of the label, and climbed high on iTunes charts.

The Lesley Gore rendition of his song "Better Angels" was featured in the 2005 season premiere of CSI: Miami. In 2006 his song "It's Gone," also performed by Gore, was featured in the final scene and closing credits of the independent film Flannel Pajamas. The film was nominated for the Grand Jury Prize at the 2006 Sundance Film Festival. On March 18, 2009, Morgan's track "Better Angels" was featured in MTV's The Real World: Brooklyn.

In June 2008, the label released 20th Century Duos for Violin and Cello with works by Zoltán Kodály, Roger Sessions and Maurice Ravel, which received a glowing review for performance and engineering in The New York Times. Two years later, following releases by David Cloyd, Melissa Giges, and Morgenstern & Adkins, singer-songwriter Janita released her solo LP Haunted on the label.

Singer-songwriter and producer David Cloyd signed to the label in 2008, and released his debut LP Unhand Me, You Fiend! in 2009. The album peaked at #1 on eMusic's Album Charts, and according to a review, "took the indie rock scene by storm." His second album, I Could Disappear, included solo versions of his debut album, with Cloyd on vocals, piano, and guitar. He released a cover of Paul McCartney's 1971 song "Dear Boy" in September 2011. As of 2013, he is Executive Vice President of Creative Operations at ECR Music Group.

Available Light, James McCartney's first official release as both a performer and songwriter, was released electronically by the label in 2010. It was produced by David Kahne and Paul McCartney, and received positive reviews. The label released his second EP, Close At Hand, in 2011.  The Complete EP Collection, which combines the previous two EPs along with five new original tracks and two new covers, was released in late 2011.

In late 2012 Engine Company Records was re-launched and rebranded as ECR Music Group, with the label itself remaining an imprint of the now larger umbrella company. The company's first release since rebranding was Blake Morgan's own most recent album, Diamonds In The Dark, (in 2013), which garnered numerous rave reviews. It was described in the press as “…one of the finest albums of 2013. A must have." and "a killer piece of art ." In 2014, Morgan's album was followed by singer-songwriter and pianist Melissa Giges' Just When I Let Go. With placements in multiple Kardashian shows, and MTV’s Real World, Giges has been heard by millions of TV fans. ECR's most recent release as of July 2015, is singer-songwriter Janita's new album Didn't You, My Dear?, which has been touted as her breakthrough record, drawing comparisons to Blonde Redhead and Patti Smith among others.

References

External links

American record labels
Record labels established in 2002
Companies based in Manhattan
2002 establishments in New York City